Angadippuram railway station is a major railway station serving the town of Angadippuram in the Malappuram District of Kerala. It lies on the scenic Nilambur–Shoranur line of Palakkad division, Southern Railways. It is also the nearest railway station to Perinthalmanna (2.5 km) and Malappuram town (20 km).

Shornur–Nilambur railway line
The Nilambur–Shoranur railway line is a branch line of the Southern Railway Zone in Kerala state and one of the shortest broad-gauge railway lines in India. It is a single line with  length running from Shoranur Junction (in Palakkad district) to Nilambur railway station (in Malappuram district).  This station is 4 km from the town of Nilambur on the Kozhikode–Ooty highway. Shoranur–Nilambur Road passenger trains are running on this route.

References

Railway stations in Malappuram district
Nilambur–Shoranur railway line